The siege of Theodosia in  was the third and final siege by the Bosporan Kingdom under Leukon I against the city of Theodosia, a probable colony of Heraclea Pontica, who had aided the city in two previous sieges.

Prelude
In the first siege, Satyros I, the father of Leukon, besieged the city but lost his life there at the age of 81. Leukon besieged the city himself but, after having been tricked by Tynnichus, retreated back to Panticapaeum. After his defeat, Leukon had to solidify his position on the throne after getting word that some of his friends and subjects were conspiring against him due his failure at Theodosia. He enlisted the aid of merchants and put down the conspiracy.

Siege
Leukon, seeing that the Heracleotes had left to their colony, possibly due to problems with Clearchus of Heraclea who had made himself tyrant of Heraclea recently, laid a sneak attack on the city of Theodosia before the Heracleotes could prepare an expedition to aid the city. Leukon succeeded in finally defeating Theodosia, who robbed his father of his life in 389 BC. After defeating Theodosia however, Leukon was invaded by the Heracleotes in his own territory, but as able to repel them through the use of Scythians to maintain his Greek troops disciplined and stable.

References

Wars of the Bosporan Kingdom
360s BC conflicts
Feodosia Municipality